Xie Wanjun (born July 10, 1967) a Chinese political activist who has fled to the United States. He is currently the chairman of China Democracy Party. He was an active student during the Tiananmen Square Protests of 1989. On October 17, 1996, he led an anti-Japan protest and was imprisoned for a month. In August 1997, he tried to apply a trade union in Shanghai but he was expelled from Shanghai. He was one of the founding members of China Democracy Party in 1998, and was elected to the central committee in February 1999, he escaped from China in April 1999, he then fled to Russia then the United States.

In 2022, he falsely claimed that corrupt officials in Henan have begun armed resistance against the central government of China.

References

External links 
Alliance Introduction 

1967 births
Living people
Chinese dissidents